Coleophora albicans is a moth of the family Coleophoridae. It is found from Fennoscandia to the Iberian Peninsula, Italy and Bulgaria and from Great Britain to southern Russia and further east to Japan. It is also known from China.

The wingspan is 11–14 mm.

The larvae feed on Artemisia absinthium, Artemisia campestris and Artemisia maritima. They create a squat tubular silken case of 6–7 mm. The frontal half is covered with felt, while the rear half is greyish with some darker longitudinal lines. The case is trivalved and the mouth angle is about 15-30°. The larvae feed on the leaves and the inflorescence.

References

External links
 Coleophora albicans at ukmoths

albicans
Moths described in 1849
Moths of Asia
Moths of Europe
Taxa named by Philipp Christoph Zeller